Daniel Bullocks (born February 28, 1983) is an American football coach and former player.  He played football professionally as safety in the National Football League (NFL) with the Detroit Lions from 2006 to 2010. He was  drafted by the Lions in the second round of the 2006 NFL Draft following his college football playing career at Nebraska.

Early years
Bullocks attended Hixson High School in Chattanooga, Tennessee, along with his brother Josh from 1997 to 2001. Daniel and Josh were both multi-sport standouts participating in track and field, as well as excelling in football. Daniel played quarterback throughout his high school career while Josh played running back. The Bullocks brothers led the Hixson Wildcats to four consecutive TSSAA football playoff appearances. Daniel and Josh were heavily recruited by several NCAA Division I schools including the University of Tennessee before deciding to attend the University of Nebraska. Daniel and Josh both graduated from Hixson High School in 2001.

College career
Bullocks attended the University of Nebraska–Lincoln where he started 22 games in four seasons, serving as co-captain during his senior season, when he was selected as a second-team All-Big 12 Conference defensive back for the second consecutive year.

Professional career

Detroit Lions
Bullocks was selected by the Detroit Lions in the second round of the 2006 NFL Draft. He played 31 games for the Lions, starting in 21. He was waived and subsequently placed on injured reserve on August 19, 2009. The Lions re-signed Bullocks on April 20, 2010. The Lions released him on July 8, 2010.

Coaching career

College coaching
Bullocks served as the defensive secondary coach for the University of Northern Iowa from 2012 to 2014.  On January 19, 2015, Bullocks was announced as the cornerbacks coach for Eastern Michigan University under head coach Chris Creighton.

Jacksonville Jaguars
On January 22, 2016, Bullocks was announced as the assistant defensive backs coach with the Jacksonville Jaguars of the National Football League.

San Francisco 49ers
In 2017 Bullocks became the 49ers assistant defensive backs coach a position he would hold for two years. In 2019 Bullocks was promoted to the safeties coach for the 49ers.

Personal life
Bullocks is the identical twin brother of Josh Bullocks, also a safety at the University of Nebraska, who was selected in the second round of the 2005 NFL draft by the New Orleans Saints. Daniel and his wife Vanessa have 4 children.

References

1983 births
Living people
American football safeties
Detroit Lions players
Eastern Michigan Eagles football coaches
Nebraska Cornhuskers football players
Northern Iowa Panthers football coaches
Sportspeople from Chattanooga, Tennessee
Players of American football from Tennessee
Identical twins
American twins
Twin sportspeople
Jacksonville Jaguars coaches
San Francisco 49ers coaches
Ed Block Courage Award recipients